Yaylalı can refer to:

 Yaylalı, Alanya
 Yaylalı, Kuyucak
 Yaylalı, Pazaryolu